The 2018 United States Senate election in Missouri took place on November 6, 2018, to elect a member of the United States Senate to represent the State of Missouri, concurrently with other elections to the United States Senate, elections to the United States House of Representatives, and various state and local elections, including Missouri's quadrennial State Auditor election.

Incumbent Democratic Senator Claire McCaskill ran for re-election to a third term. McCaskill easily won her party's nomination, defeating several minor candidates in the primary, while Missouri Attorney General Josh Hawley comfortably won the Republican primary.

The candidate filing deadline was March 27, 2018, and the primary election was held on August 7, 2018. Pollsters predicted a tight race, however Hawley defeated McCaskill on election day by 5.8%, taking 51.4% of the vote to McCaskill's 45.6%, a somewhat larger margin than expected. This resulted in Republicans holding both Senate seats in Missouri for the first time since McCaskill took office in 2007. Hawley was also the youngest incumbent senator at that time and continued to be until the election of Jon Ossoff in 2021.

Democratic primary

Candidates

Nominated
 Claire McCaskill, incumbent U.S. Senator

Eliminated in primary
 Angelica Earl, former insurance verification specialist
 David Faust
 Travis Gonzalez, perennial candidate
 John Hogan, perennial candidate
 Leonard Steinman, perennial candidate
 Carla (Coffee) Wright

Endorsements

Results

Republican primary

Candidates

Nominated
Josh Hawley, Missouri Attorney General

Eliminated in primary
Austin Petersen, businessman and Libertarian candidate for presidential nomination in 2016
Brian Hagg
 Bradley Krembs
 Tony Monetti, retired bomber pilot and assistant dean of aviation at University of Central Missouri
 Kristi Nichols, activist and candidate for the U.S. Senate in 2010 and 2016
 Ken Patterson, candidate for St. Louis County Executive in 2010
 Peter Pfeifer
 Fred Ryman, Constitution nominee for the U.S. Senate in 2016
 Christina Smith
 Courtland Sykes, veteran and former congressional aide

Withdrew
 Camille Lombardi-Olive, Democratic candidate for MO-07 in 2016

Declined
 Ann Wagner, U.S. Representative and former U.S. Ambassador to Luxembourg
 Aaron Hedlund, economics professor
 Paul Curtman, state representative
 Eric Greitens, former Governor of Missouri
 Vicky Hartzler, U.S. Representative
 Todd Richardson, Speaker of the Missouri House of Representatives
 Eric Schmitt, state treasurer
 David Wasinger, attorney
 Marsha Haefner, state representative
 Ed Martin, former chairman of the Missouri Republican Party, nominee for MO-03 in 2010 and nominee for attorney general in 2012

Endorsements

Debates

Polling

Results

Libertarian primary

Candidates

Nominated
 Japheth Campbell, entrepreneur

Withdrew
 Don Donald
 Dennis Lagares

Declined
 Alicia Dearn, attorney and candidate for Vice President of the United States in 2016
 Austin Petersen, Libertarian candidate for President of the United States in 2016 (running as a Republican)

Results

Green primary

Candidates

Nominated
 Jo Crain

Eliminated in primary
 Jerome Bauer

Results

Independents

Candidates

Declared
Craig O'Dear, attorney

General election

Predictions

Debates
Complete video of debate, October 18, 2018

Fundraising

Polling

with Austin Petersen

with generic Republican

with Vicky Hartzler

with Blaine Luetkemeyer

with Todd Richardson

with Eric Schmitt

with Jason Smith

Results
Sen. McCaskill conceded a few hours after the polls closed on Election day. Despite performing strongly in the St. Louis suburbs, she ran well behind her 2012 vote in Southeast Missouri, especially in the Lead Belt and the Missouri Bootheel. She also ran poorly in the northern part of the state. Despite McCaskill's loss, Missouri Democrats held the other statewide office that went up for election in this cycle, the office of Missouri State Auditor. Democratic incumbent state auditor Nicole Galloway, who had been appointed to the post in 2015 by then-Gov. Jay Nixon following a vacancy, won a full term in the 2018 State Auditor election.

References

External links
Candidates at Vote Smart
Candidates at Ballotpedia
Campaign finance at FEC
Campaign finance at OpenSecrets

Official campaign websites
Japheth Campbell (L) for Senate
Jo Crain (G) for Senate
Josh Hawley (R) for Senate
Claire McCaskill (D) for Senate 
Craig O'Dear (I) for Senate

2018
Missouri
2018 Missouri elections